Senate elections were held in Pakistan on 3 March 2009. All 100 of the 100 seats in the Senate were up for election with the winning candidates serving six-year terms.

Results
Pakistan People's Party Parliamentarians 27 seats
Pakistan Muslim League (Q) 21 seats
Independent 13 seats
Muttahida Majlis-e-Amal 9 seats
Pakistan Muslim League (N) 7 seats
Awami National Party 6 seats
Mutahidda Qaumi Movement 6 seats
Jamiat Ulema-e-Islam (F) 4 seats
Balochistan National Party 2 seats
Jamhoori Wattan Party 1 seat
National Peoples Party (Pakistan) 1 seat
Pakhtunkhwa Milli Awami Party 1 seat
Pakistan Muslim League (F) 1 seat
Pakistan Peoples Party 1 seat

References

Senate
Senate elections in Pakistan